Stephen I of Hungary (c. 975 – 1038) was the last Grand Prince of the Hungarians and the first King of Hungary.

Stephen of Hungary may also refer to:
Géza, Grand Prince of the Hungarians, whose baptismal name was Stephen
Stephen II of Hungary
Stephen III of Hungary
Stephen IV of Hungary
Stephen V of Hungary
Stephen the Posthumous
Stephen, Duke of Slavonia
Archduke Stephen, Palatine of Hungary